Arnaud Lagardère (born 18 March 1961) is a French businessman, the General and Managing Partner of Lagardère SCA, holding company of the Lagardère Group. He is the son of Jean-Luc Lagardère, the former chairman of Matra and Hachette.

Career

With a DEA higher degree (Master) in economics from Paris Dauphine University, Arnaud Lagardère joined the Lagardère Group in 1986.

He was appointed Director (1986) and then CEO (1989) of MMB, which became Lagardère SCA in 1996. Since that time, he has held different positions within the Group, including Chairman of Grolier Inc. in the United States (1994–1998), Chairman of Europe 1 - Communication (1999–2007), etc.; since 2003, he has headed the Lagardère Group as General Partner.

Since his arrival at the head of the group in 2003, Arnaud Lagardère has gradually refocused Lagardère Group to make it a pure media group which is among the world leaders in the sector. In book publishing, the group acquired 40% of Vivendi Universal Publishing, Houghton Mifflin, and Warner Books: Today, Lagardère Publishing is number two in its sector worldwide. In 2006, it created a new entity – Lagardère Sports – which became Lagardère Unlimited in May 2010, specializing in sport industry and entertainment, with the successive acquisitions of Sportfive, IEC in Sports, World Sport Group and Best.
In September 2015, Lagardère Unlimited has been renamed Lagardère Sports and Entertainment.

Today, driven by Arnaud Lagardère, the group is working to expand its business digitally, especially in publishing and media.
Arnaud Lagardère has been a Director of France Télécom (2003–2008), LVMH  (2003–2009), and FIMALAC (2003–2006), and a member of the Supervisory Board of Le Monde (2005–2008).

Positions

Positions in the group

Arnaud Lagardère is the General and Managing Partner of Lagardère SCA, holding company of the Lagardère Group. Arnaud Lagardère is Chairman and Chief Executive Officer of Hachette SA, whose trade name is Lagardère Media, Chief Executive Officer of Lagardère Sports and Entertainment, Chairman of the Supervisory Board of Lagardère Active and Lagardère Travel Retail, and Director of Hachette Livre (Lagardère Publishing). Arnaud Lagardère is also President of the Jean-Luc Lagardère Foundation.

Other positions outside the group

Outside the group, Arnaud Lagardère was Director and Chairman of SOGEADE-GÉRANCE (a French holding company for aeronautics, defense, and space) from 2007 to 2013, member of the Board of Directors of EADS N.V. from 2003 to 2013, and member of the Conseil stratégique des technologies de l’information (Strategic Information Technology Council) from 2004 to 2007.

Personal life
Lagardère was married to Manuela Erdōdy from 1985 to 2010. Then he married the Belgian model Jade Foret in Paris on 24 May 2013.

References

External links 
 Official website of Lagardère Group
 Lagardère Publishing / Hachette Livre
 Lagardère Active
 Lagardère Travel Retail
 Lagardère Sports and Entertainment
 Jean-Luc Lagardère Foundation

1961 births
Living people
People from Boulogne-Billancourt
French book publishers (people)
Paris Dauphine University alumni
Arnaud